Phyllonorycter comparella is a moth of the family Gracillariidae. It is found from Germany and the Baltic States to Spain, Sardinia, Sicily, Hungary and Bulgaria and from Great Britain to central and southern Russia.

The wingspan is about 8 mm.

The larvae feed on Populus alba, Populus canescens and sometimes Populus nigra. They mine the leaves of their host plant. They create an oval, lower-surface tentiform mine. The lower epidermis has no recognisable folds. The frass is heaped in an angle of the mine. The pupa is found in a barely recognisable flimsy cocoon.

External links
bladmineerders.nl 
Fauna Europaea

comparella
Moths of Europe
Moths described in 1843